Sir William Inge (c. 1260 – May 1322) was an English lawyer, and Chief Justice of the King's Bench for a few months from 1316 to 1317. He was born in or near Dunstable, Bedfordshire, the son of Thomas Inge, a minor landowner and administrator. William Inge acted as an attorney at the common bench from 1281 and 1285, and was a serjeants of the king between 1287 and 1293. He was employed as a justice of eyre and of the assize, and became a regular assize justice in 1293. He had been knighted by 1300.

In the early years of the fourteenth century, he accompanied King Edward I several times on the king's campaigns in Scotland. 

After 1307, Inge remained close with the new king, Edward II, and acted as a commissioner in France in 1310–11. He was appointed justice of the common bench in 1313, and held this post until he was appointed Chief Justice of the King's Bench in 1316, upon the death of Roger Brabazon.

By this time, however, serious allegations of corruption had been raised against Inge. He was accused of, and convicted of, improper conduct over the purchase of the manor of Woodmansterne in Surrey. Though the conviction came after he had been dismissed as Chief Justice, it is likely that the allegations contributed to his downfall.
He took no part in public life after this.

Personal life and death

Inge was married twice, and had one daughter by his first wife – Joan, who married Eon la Zouche, and when widowed from him Robert Moton of Peckleton. William Inge died some time shortly before 10 May 1322.

References

.

13th-century births
1322 deaths
13th-century English judges
Lord chief justices of England and Wales
Justices of the Common Pleas
Serjeants-at-law (England)
Knights Bachelor
14th-century English judges